ZPE may refer to:
Zero-point energy
Zeitschrift für Papyrologie und Epigraphik